Kathleen Munroe (born April 9, 1982) is a Canadian actress and wig maker.

Munroe was born in Hamilton, Ontario, and currently resides in Los Angeles. She studied cinema at the University of Toronto. She won the 2010 ACTRA Award for Outstanding Female Performance.  Munroe writes and plays music. She speaks fluent English and French.
Munroe identifies as queer.

Filmography

Film

Television

References

External links
 
 Kathleen Munroe at Allrovi

1982 births
Actresses from Hamilton, Ontario
Canadian film actresses
Canadian television actresses
Living people
University of Toronto alumni
21st-century Canadian actresses
Queer women
Queer actresses